Anania inclusalis is a moth in the family Crambidae. It was described by Francis Walker in 1866. It is found in Honduras and Colombia.

References

Moths described in 1866
Pyraustinae
Moths of Central America
Moths of South America